Kheyrabad-e Sofla may refer to:
 Kheyrabad-e Sofla, Kohgiluyeh and Boyer-Ahmad
 Kheyrabad-e Sofla, Lorestan
 Kheyrabad-e Sofla, Razavi Khorasan